O18 or O-18 may refer to:

Places

Airports
 Hanford Municipal Airport, in California, United States; formerly assigned FAA LID O18
 Buzzards Roost Airport (FAA LID O18), Inola, Oklahoma, USA; see List of airports in Oklahoma

Rail stations
 Tondabayashi Station (station code O18), Tondabayashi, Osaka Prefecture, Japan
 Xinzhuang metro station (station code O18), Xinzhuang District, New Taipei, Taiwan

Literature
 Naos (hieroglyph) (Gardiner code O18), an Egyptian hieroglyphic representing a shrine
 Minuscule 442 (Soden code O18), a Greek New Testament minuscule manuscript
 Minuscule 441 (Soden code O18), a Greek New Testament minuscule manuscript

Other uses
 Curtiss O-18 Falcon, an observation aircraft of the United States Army Air Corps
 Oxygen-18, an isotope of oxygen
Delta-O-18, a measure of the ratio of stable isotopes 18O:16O (oxygen-18:oxygen-16)
MSC(O)-18, minesweeper built for the United States Navy during World War II
 over age 18 (O18), an age grouping, such as found in sports

See also

 Canadian National Class O-18-a steam locomotives
 
 
 018 (disambiguation) (zero-one-eight)
 18O (disambiguation)
 18 (disambiguation)
 O (disambiguation)
 U18 (disambiguation)